Iwiczno  is a village in the administrative district of Gmina Kaliska, within Starogard County, Pomeranian Voivodeship, in northern Poland. It is located within the ethnocultural region of Kociewie in the historic region of Pomerania.

The village has a population of 254.

Iwiczno was a royal village of the Polish Crown, administratively located in the Tczew County in the Pomeranian Voivodeship.

Notable people
  (1874–1925), Polish journalist and ethnographer, Kashubian poet, officer of the Polish Army, founder of the Kashubian Ethnographic Park in Wdzydze Kiszewskie

References

Iwiczno